is a Japanese hard science fiction manga written and illustrated by Makoto Yukimura. It was serialized in Kodansha's seinen manga magazine Morning between January 1999 to January 2004, with its chapters collected into four tankōbon volumes. It was adapted into a 26-episode anime television series by Sunrise, which was broadcast on NHK from October 2003 through April 2004. The story revolves around the crew of a space debris collection craft in the year 2075.

The manga was published in English in North America by Tokyopop, and the anime was distributed in North America by Bandai Entertainment. Both the manga and anime received the Seiun Award for best science fiction series.

Plot

The story of Planetes follows the crew of the DS-12 "Toy Box" of the Space Debris Section, a unit of Technora Corporation. Debris Section's purpose is to prevent the damage or destruction of satellites, space stations and spacecraft from collision with space debris in Earth's and the Moon's orbits. They use a number of methods to dispose of the debris (mainly by burning it via atmospheric reentry or through salvage), accomplished through the use of EVA suits.

The story sometimes revolves around debris collection itself, but more often the concept of collecting "trash" in space is merely a storytelling method for building character development. The members of the Debris Section are looked down upon as the lowest members of the company and they must work hard to prove their worth to others and accomplish their dreams.

Ongoing plot elements include an upcoming exploratory mission to Jupiter on the new fusion powered ship, Von Braun, and the lead character's decision to join the mission, no matter the cost. Many other plot threads are also developed throughout the series that help to explain each character's motivations and personalities. The Space Defense Front is a terrorist organization that believes humankind is exploiting space without first curing global problems such as mass famine and the widened socio-economic divide on Earth.

Realism

Technical

The story of Planetes takes place in the near future. Special care was given for a realistic depiction of space and space travel. For instance, when in a weightless environment, the frame count dramatically increases in order to make weightless motion more fluid and realistic; spaceships make no noise in space and astronauts routinely suffer from known space illnesses such as radiation poisoning, decompression sickness, cancer, brittle bones and mental illnesses spawned from isolation.

Concepts like momentum in weightlessness are early plot points and are always illustrated naturally. Director Goro Taniguchi stated in the DVD commentary that he learned much about orbital mechanics in the course of making the series. This can be shown in showing specific orbital energy, through changing orbits by applying thrust throughout the series. Even the necessity for the retrieval of space debris that is central to the plot is rooted in the serious and growing problem with space debris today.

The show also works to connect itself to the history of rocketry and space flight. The opening sequence is similar to the television series Star Trek: Enterprise, featuring a montage of the history of space flight from Greek mythology to the "modern" setting outlined in the series. Along the way, animated images of important milestones in space travel like Robert Goddard's early rocket tests, the V-2 rocket, Sputnik 1, Laika the dog, the Vostok spacecraft, Apollo 11, Skylab, Mir, the International Space Station and the Space Shuttle Endeavour and other milestones are displayed. References to early pioneers in rocketry like Konstantin Tsiolkovsky, Robert H. Goddard, Wernher von Braun and Hermann Oberth are also made regularly.

The Japanese space agency JAXA served as a technical consultant to the series. The US version of the DVDs featured interviews with two scientists from NASA's Orbital Debris Section. However, both scientists stated that the premise of having to rendezvous with debris in orbit is highly unlikely as it would take an extravagant amount of energy for a relatively small amount of salvageable material. One of the scientists stated that the previous director of the NASA Orbital Debris Section was in fact Donald J. Kessler, the scientist who proposed the eponymous Kessler Syndrome, which is cited and used several times in both the anime and manga.

Human elements
The story also depicts the richer countries monopolizing resources in space and the poorer ones falling into civil war and being invaded or needing the assistance of those richer countries, telling a story of dependency theory and the negative side of environmentalism. The conflicting views of the terrorist group, the Space Defense Front, who wish to shut human beings off from space, the main characters who believe in the importance of space exploration and development, and the International Treaty Organization (INTO) which wants space development primarily to serve the economic and military needs of developed nations also play major roles. The anime refrains from oversimplification of the various factions, portraying both true believers and those with ulterior motives on all sides. The final settlement of the conflict is also unique in that it is not resolved by any of the main protagonists or antagonists, but by a compromise struck between powers above their heads.

Themes

The themes in Planetes are philosophical, sociological, and political in nature.

The theme most prevalent within the plot is the relationship between space, humanity, and the individual. Hachimaki struggles throughout the story with his own relationship with space and consequently, other people.
Existential dread (or angst) and the characters' response to it is an important part to their characterization. The characters' response to angst, particularly the protagonist Hachimaki, becomes a source of both internal and external conflict throughout the story.
Both the manga and the anime criticize artificial divisions, including political divisions within humanity, as well as divisions between nations, individuals, and class divisions.
In the anime, several characters were introduced in order to add its criticism of salaryman culture. Some of these characters are portrayed only to seek to climb the corporate ladder, however unlikely it may be. This fact makes several characters lose sight of the importance of their job, however lowly others might see it. At the same time, several characters are introduced who seek to work within the system in order to make a difference.
More generally, the series examines the difference between greed and ambition. The purpose and consequences of space exploration are seen both as they relate to humanity as a whole, and how they relate to the Hoshino family in particular. For humanity, space exploration holds the promise of increased wealth and prosperity. However, as the most wealthy nations are the only ones that can develop space, they are the only ones who end up reaping the benefits. Similarly, the protagonist, Hachirota Hoshino, initially wants to go faster and farther than he ever has before, yet as a result he nearly destroys both himself, and his relationships with others. Hachi's father, Goro Hoshino, is also caught between the two, having spent many years away from his wife and children so that he could explore space. Lastly, Hachi's younger brother, Kyutaro Hoshino, is obsessed with building rockets, either to make a name for himself, to upstage his brother, or to gain more attention and respect from his family, even if this occasionally results in putting their lives in danger when one of his rockets flies out of control.

Production

Though author/illustrator Makoto Yukimura does not have a background in the sciences, the idea of Planetes came to him while reading a book called A Garbage Problem in Space: Space Debris, and found the Japanese phonetics for the word debris amusing. Yukimura intentionally did not research space technology for fears that it would compromise his artistic freedom.

The presentation of technology in the anime adaptation broke from the manga in several areas, such as with the inclusion of touch-controlled HUDs, retractable debris face shields with a video screen, and peripheral cameras to the EVA suits the main characters use. Also, the anime introduces refinements in the weightless living and working spaces, with foot and hand bars for people to stabilize their movement in a weightless environment. The base of operations of Toy Box is moved from the Moon to a space station called the ISPV 7 in low Earth orbit. The United States of America is explicitly named in the manga, as opposed to in the anime where it is seldom mentioned in favor of "INTO" or the International Treaty Organization (a possible reference to NATO and SEATO), which seems to be a federation of individual countries including the United States and Japan.

Planetes shared part of its production staff with another anime series that ran at the same time on NHK, Twin Spica. From this, the production staff slipped several easter egg cross overs into Planetes. Some of these include:
The hotel on the ISPV 7 Space Station is called the Hotel Spica.
Episode 20 of the Planetes anime featured an isolation test which mirrored the isolation test which was part of the National Space Academy entrance test in Twin Spica.
Inflated spherical escape pods, or "rescue balls" are featured in both series at some point.

There are several times where the anime and the manga would allude to each other. The following are some examples of this:
"Nora", Technora Corporation's mascot in the anime is originally Hachimaki's alien friend who appeared in a dream.
The white cat the SDF used as an avatar in the anime to talk to the Union conference delegates in episode 23 is Hachimaki's vision of God during his vision quest on the Lunar surface.
In episode 22, the Debris Section Office Staff visit the Moon Debris Section office and find that the office staff there is very similar to them. This is a reference to the fact that the Toy Box and its crew were based on the Moon in the manga.
In a non-canon yonkoma gag strip in the manga, Tanabe is defeated in volleyball by Claire (who only appears in the anime). However, Claire's face is not seen, as she states that the cartoonist "Isn't confident enough to draw me".

Media

Manga

Written and illustrated by Makoto Yukimura, the twenty-six chapters appeared as a serial in the Kodansha's seinen manga magazine Weekly Morning from January 1999 to January 2004. Kodansha collected the chapters into four tankōbon volumes, and published them from January 23, 2001, to February 23, 2004. It was licensed for an English-language translation in North America by Tokyopop. It published the series in five volumes by splitting the last volume in two parts from October 7, 2003, to February 8, 2005. The translation was rereleased in two omnibus volumes by Dark Horse Comics on December 22, 2015, and May 10, 2016.

Anime

The anime adaptation of Planetes began airing its 26-episode run on NHK BS-2 on October 4, 2003, and ended on February 23, 2004. Produced and animated by Sunrise, it was directed by Gorō Taniguchi and scripted by Ichirō Ōkouchi. The anime began development and production before the end of the manga serialization. In the beginning and middle of the series, the writing and production staff only had the first three volumes of the manga as source. In order to fill the entire 26-episode run of the anime, new characters, new settings and new relationships between characters were made in order to increase dramatic tension, reinforce themes introduced in the manga, and introduce new themes that were compatible with the manga. While the manga deals more with existential themes, and humanity's relationship with space, the anime further expands the political elements of the story.

The music score was composed by Kōtarō Nakagawa and produced by Victor Entertainment. The opening theme is "Dive in the Sky" by Mikio Sakai, and the ending themes are "Wonderful Life" by Mikio Sakai for episodes 1-25 and "Planetes" by Hitomi Kuroishi for episode 26. There are two insert songs, "A Secret of the Moon" by Hitomi Kuroishi, used in various episodes, and "Thanks My Friend" by Mikio Sakai used in episode 13.

Reception
Both the manga and the anime were critically acclaimed. According to Anime News Network, the manga has a "solid, engrossing storyline and well-developed characters". Anime News Network also proclaimed Planetes to be the best science fiction anime series of 2005. Both the manga and anime received the Seiun Award for best science fiction series, the manga in 2002 and the anime in 2005. The manga was nominated for a Angoulême International Comics Festival award in the Raja Eco-Fauve Selection category in 2023.

In terms of sales, the manga was only a modest success in North America, with volume 3 reaching 81st place on the Diamond US sales top 100, selling about 1100 copies through the distributor. Volume 4 reached 93rd place, selling about 1400 copies.

See also

Kessler syndrome § In fiction

References

Further reading

External links
 
Bandai Entertaiment site

 
1999 manga
2003 anime television series debuts
Bandai Entertainment anime titles
Dark Horse Comics titles
Hard science fiction
Kodansha manga
NHK original programming
Science fiction anime and manga
Seinen manga
Sunrise (company)
Television series set in the 2070s
Television shows written by Ichirō Ōkouchi
Tokyopop titles